Montiglio is an Italian surname. Notable people with the surname include:
César Montiglio (born 1984), Argentine footballer
Dominick Montiglio  (1947 – 2021), American former associate of the Gambino crime family
Víctor Montiglio (1944−2011), Chilean lawyer who served as president of the Supreme Court of Chile

See also 

 Montiglio (disambiguation)

Italian-language surnames